Kaohsiung Main Station is a railway and metro station in Sanmin District, Kaohsiung, Taiwan served by the Taiwan Railways and Kaohsiung Rapid Transit. It is one of four special class stations, the highest class with the most services. It is currently undergoing reconstruction, scheduled to be complete in 2024.

History
It opened in 1900 and served trains to Tainan. The Fengshan (then ) line opened in 1907. The station at the current site was built between 1933 and 1941. Towards the end of the century, it was decided that the railway was to be moved underground within Kaohsiung. A temporary station building was used between 2002 and 2018, when the underground station was partially opened. A temporary metro station was also used between 2008 and 2018. Construction on the remaining segments of the project is scheduled to be complete in 2024.

The rebuilt station was designed to accommodate the proposed extension of Taiwan High Speed Rail. However, on 27 September 2019, the Pingtung extension was confirmed to bypass central Kaohsiung.

TRA railway 

The TRA portion is a three-level underground railway station with two island platforms. The 1941 station building is planned to be moved back to the original position for display.

The TRA railway in Kaohsiung also serves as a commuter rail. Nevertheless, the railway in Kaohsiung only has the capacity of double-track, making it difficult to allow many such shuttle trains as EMU800 for domestic transportation to run through at once.

Metro 
The rapid transit station is a two-level, underground station with one entrance. It is located at Jianguo 2nd Road. On 5 September 2018, it was relocated 100 metres north, making it the first metro station in Taiwan to be relocated. The new platforms are lengthened to allow for six carriages up from three. The former concourse and platforms are closed and reserved for emergency use.

KMRT Station

 2008-03-09: Red line between Ciaotou and Siaogang opened.

Taiwan Railway Administration (TRA)
Western line
Pingtung Line
Kaohsiung Mass Rapid Transit
Red Line

High-speed rail 
There was originally a plan for the HSR tracks to be constructed underground from Zuoying HSR station to this station together with the planning of the TRA tracks being moved underground. However, due to the fact that the construction of the HSR extension would be at a relatively high cost, it was decided to only begin moving the TRA in Kaohsiung underground, and the HSR would terminate at Zuoying. Even though no space was reserved for the HSR during construction of the TRA underground project, space has still been reserved at Kaohsiung Main Station to set up HSR platforms.

Health concerns
A team from NSYSU examined air quality in Kaohsiung main station on early October 2019 and found that the PM2.5 was 17 times higher than that of standard, putting passengers and workers at risk of getting lung disease. Trains equipped with diesel engine that run through South-Link Line, the only single-track and non-electrified railway in Taiwan, were to blame.

Around the station
 Chang-Gu World Trade Center
 Kaohsiung Municipal Kaohsiung Senior High School
 Kaohsiung Vision Museum
 Sankuaicuo Station
 Sanfong Central Street
 Sanfeng Temple
 Jianguo Rd. Computer Market
 Changming Rd. Clothing, Electronics, and Spare Parts Market
 Kaohsiung Bus Station
 Kuo-Kuang Motor Transportation Co., Aloha Bus Co., United Bus Co., Ho-Hsin Bus Traffic Co. Stations

See also
 List of railway stations in Taiwan

References

External links

 TRA Kaohsiung Station 
 Taiwan Railways Administration 
 KRTC Kaohsiung Main Station 

1941 establishments in Taiwan
Kaohsiung Metro Red line stations
Railway stations opened in 1941
Railway stations served by Taiwan Railways Administration
Transport infrastructure completed in 2018